Now is the eighth studio album by Australian pop singer John Paul Young, released in September 1996. The album was released through Albert Productions and spawned the single "Happy the Man".

Now includes a re-recorded version of "Love Is in the Air". John Paul Young returned to Germany after a 20-year absence to tour this album. He appearing on TV programmes & specials.

Track listing

References

External links
John Paul Young - Now @ Lastfm

John Paul Young albums
1996 albums
Albert Productions albums
Albums produced by Harry Vanda
Albums produced by George Young (rock musician)